Jingle Bell Jazz (re-issued as Christmas Jazz) is a collection of jazz versions of Christmas songs recorded between 1959 and 1962 by some of the most popular artists on the Columbia label. It was released on October 17, 1962.

Recording and releases
Most tracks were recorded by Teo Macero in New York City across 1962. The only completely original tune is "Blue Xmas (To Whom It May Concern)", written by Miles Davis and Bob Dorough. Davis called up Dorough in 1962 and asked him to write the song and sing on it, even though the two had never recorded together.

The album was reissued twice on LP, in 1973 and 1980, with a track alteration and different cover art. Columbia has issued a CD called Jingle Bell Jazz with several tracks from the original LP and several newer tracks, with different cover art from both LP versions.

In 1985, Columbia repuporsed the name of this compilation and took some tracks from its original release as well as some tracks from the 1981 compilation God Rest Ye Merry, Jazzmen.

Reception
At the time of its release, Jingle Bell Jazz was reviewed in Billboard: "Unfortunately, this album is reaching the market too late to really be a factor this year, but it contains such a swinging, bright collection of jazz names, it certainly bears comment." The re-released compilation including tracks from God Rest Ye Merry, Jazzmen was reviewed by AllMusic Guide, whose editors scored the album three out of five stars, with reviewer Scott Yanow noting how there are multitudinous such samplers, with this one having several highlights. (Yanow also reviewed the 1981 compilation, which AllMusic Guide gave three stars, calling it "interesting if not overly essential music".)

Despite his unenthusiastic assessment of his contribution to Jingle Bell Jazz, Miles Davis recalled the recording session as the beginning of a fruitful collaboration with saxophonist Wayne Shorter: "Columbia got the bright idea of making an album for Christmas, and they thought it would be hip if I had this silly singer named Bob Dorough on the album, with Gil arranging. We got Wayne Shorter on tenor, Frank Rehak on trombone, and Willie Bobo on bongos, and in August we did this album. The less said about it the better, but it did let me play with Wayne Shorter for the first time, and I really liked what he was into."

Jingle Bell Jazz reached No. 28 on the Billboard Christmas Albums Chart on December 10, 1988.

Track listing

Side One
 "Jingle Bells" (James Lord Pierpont, arranged by Mercer Ellington) by Duke Ellington and His Orchestra – 3:00
 "White Christmas" (Irving Berlin) by Lionel Hampton – 2:31
 "Winter Wonderland" (Felix Bernard and Richard Bernhard Smith) by Chico Hamilton – 5:23
 "The Christmas Song (Chestnuts Roasting on an Open Fire)" (Mel Tormé and Robert Wells) by Carmen McRae – 3:54
 "Rudolph the Red-Nosed Reindeer" (Johnny Marks) by Pony Poindexter – 2:31
 "We Three Kings of Orient Are" (traditional tune, lyrics by John Henry Hopkins Jr.) by Paul Horn – 3:50

Side Two
 "Santa Claus Is Comin' to Town" (J. Fred Coots and Haven Gillespie) by Dave Brubeck – 3:40
 "Deck Us All with Boston Charlie" (Norman Monath and Walt Kelly, based on "Deck the Halls", a traditional tune with lyrics by Thomas Oliphant) by Lambert, Hendricks & Ross – 3:12
 "Frosty the Snowman" (Steve Nelson and Walter Rollins) by Dukes of Dixieland – 1:43
 "If I Were a Bell" (Frank Loesser) by Manhattan Jazz All–Stars – 2:54
 "Rockin' Around the Christmas Tree" (Johnny Marks) by Marlowe Morris – 2:25
 "Blue Xmas (To Whom It May Concern)" (Miles Davis and Bob Dorough) by Miles Davis  – 2:40

The 1973 Harmony re-release removes "Rudolph the Red-Nose Reindeer", slightly shuffles the tracks, and adds "Deck the Halls" by Herbie Hancock (duration: 4:59), recorded in 1969. The 1980 Columbia reissue restores "Rudolph", but removes "Frosty the Snowman", replacing it with "Deck the Halls". Digital editions of the compilation include all thirteen tracks, with "Deck the Halls" rounding out the compilation.

Personnel
Credits and recording information are adapted from the 1980 Columbia Records Jazz Odyssey Series release (catalogue number PC 36803).

"Jingle Bells" (recorded in New York City, June 28, 1962)
Cat Anderson – trumpet
Aaron Bell – double bass
Bill Berry – trumpet
Lawrence Brown – trombone
Roy Burrows – trumpet
Harry Carney – reeds
Chuck Connors – trombone
Paul Gonsalves – reeds
Jimmy Hamilton – reeds
Johnny Hodges – reeds
Ray Nance – trumpet
Russell Procope – reeds
Billy Strayhorn – piano
Britt Woodman – trombone
Sam Woodyard – drums

"White Christmas" (recorded in New York City, January 11, 1962)
Eddie Bert – trombone
Robert Byrne – trombone
George Duvivier – double bass
Tommy Flanagan – piano
Lionel Hampton – vibraphone
Richard Hixson – trombone
Osie Johnson – drums
Teo Macero – arrangement
Billy Mackel – guitar
Lou McGarity – trombone

"Winter Wonderland" (recorded in New York City, May 26, 1961)
Buddy Catlett – double bass
Nat Gershman – cello
Chico Hamilton – drums
Charles Lloyd – saxophone
Harry W. Polk – guitar

"The Christmas Song (Chestnuts Roasting on an Open Fire)" (recorded in New York City, June 29, 1962)
Bob Cranshaw – double bass
Carmen McRae – vocals
Norman Simmons – celesta

"Rudolph the Red-Nosed Reindeer" (recorded in New York City, May 23, 1962)
Pepper Adams – baritone saxophone
Dexter Gordon – tenor saxophone
Gildo Mahones – piano
Billy Mitchell – tenor saxophone
Gene Quill – alto saxophone
Charlie Persip – drums
Pony Poindexter – alto saxophone, soprano saxophone
Phil Woods – alto saxophone
Bill Yancy – double bass

"We Three Kings of Orient Are" (recorded in Hollywood, August 15, 1962)
Victor Gaskin – double bass
Paul Horn – flute, arrangement
Paul Moer – piano
Emil Richards – vibraphone
Milt Turner – drums

"Santa Claus Is Comin' to Town" (recorded in New York City, June 2, 1962)
Dave Brubeck – piano
Paul Desmond – alto saxophone
Joe Morello – drums
Eugene Wright – double bass

"Deck Us All with Boston Charlie" (recorded in New York City, May 4, 1962)
Jon Hendricks – vocals
Ike Isaacs – double bass
Dave Lambert – vocals
Gildo Mahones – piano
Annie Ross – vocals
Jimmy Wormworth – drums

"Frosty the Snowman" (recorded October 17, 1962)

The 1962 release does not feature liner notes of a listing of recording sessions like the subsequent re-issues. The back cover features a picture of the band, showing eight members of the Dukes of Dixieland, which may have included members such as:
Frank Assunto
Fred Assunto
Papa Jac Assunto
Buzzy Drootin
Jack Maheu
Barney Mallon
Stanley Mendelsohn
Tommy Rundell
Gene Schroeder

"If I Were a Bell" (recorded in New York City, October 19, 1959)
Teddy Charles – vibraphone
Addison Farmer – trumpet
Teo Macero – saxophone
Dave McKenna – piano
Jimmy Raney – guitar
Ed Shaughnessy – drums
Nick Travis – trumpet

"Rockin' Around the Christmas Tree" (recorded in New York City, August 16, 1962)
Ray Barretto – drums
Jo Jones – drums
Marlowe Morris – organ

"Blue Xmas (To Whom It May Concern)" (recorded in New York City, August 25, 1962)
Paul Chambers – double bass
Jimmy Cobb – drums
William Correa – bongos, congas
Miles Davis – trumpet
Bob Dorough – vocals
Frank Rehak – trombone
Wayne Shorter – saxophone

"Deck the Halls" (recorded in New York City, January 14, 1969)
Al Caiola – guitar
Dave Carey – vibraphone
Jay Cee – arrangement
Jimmy Cleveland – trombone
Chick Corea – piano
George Duvivier – double bass
Herbie Hancock – piano
Ed Shaughnessy – drums
Woody Shaw – trumpet
Frank Wess – saxophone

Technical personnel
John Berg – design (1980 re-release)
Harold Chapman – engineering
Frank Driggs – production on "Rockin' Around the Christmas Tree"
Harry Fein – remastering (1980 re-release)
Mort Goode – production
Arthur Kendy – engineering (1980 re-release)
Frank Laico – engineering
Teo Macero – production on all tracks other than "We Three Kings of Orient Are" and "Rockin' Around the Christmas Tree" 
Ken Robbins – artwork (1980 re-release)
Irving Townsend – production on "We Three Kings of Orient Are"
Murray Zimney – engineering

References

External links

1962 Christmas albums
1962 compilation albums
Albums produced by Frank Driggs
Albums produced by Irving Townsend
Albums produced by Teo Macero
Christmas albums by American artists
Christmas compilation albums
Columbia Records Christmas albums
Columbia Records compilation albums
Jazz albums by American artists
Jazz compilation albums
Jazz Christmas albums